The Dutch cricket team is a national cricket team representing the Netherlands. It is administered by the Koninklijke Nederlandse Cricket Bond (Royal Dutch Cricket Association) which is based in Nieuwegein in the centre of the country and is older than many renowned cricket clubs in the West Indies, Australia, and New Zealand. The Netherlands have participated in the 1996, 2003, 2007 and 2011 Cricket World Cups.

Cricket World Cup Record

World Cup Record (By Team)

1996 World Cup

In 1994 the Dutch finally qualified for the World Cup, after finishing third in that year's ICC Trophy. In the World Cup itself in 1996, they were eliminated in the first round, but performed with some credit in their game against England.

2003 World Cup

2001 finally saw the Netherlands win the ICC Trophy, beating Namibia in the final in Toronto. They thus qualified for the 2003 World Cup. They again failed to progress beyond the first round in the tournament, but recorded their first one day international win over Namibia during the tournament. Feiko Kloppenburg (with 121) and Klaas-Jan van Noortwijk (134 not out) scored the first two One Day International centuries in the side's history.

2007 World Cup

In the 2005 ICC Trophy, the Netherlands finished 5th, qualifying for the 2007 Cricket World Cup, and gaining one-day International status until the 2009 ICC World Cup Qualifier. The 2007 World Cup was in the West Indies, and the Netherlands were eliminated in the first round, though they did beat Scotland along the way.

In a match shortened to 40 overs due to wet pitch conditions, South Africa still managed the third 200-run victory at this World Cup, scoring runs at a rate faster than that recorded by Sri Lanka when they set the world record number of runs in a One-day International in July 2006 against this Dutch team. Though Dutch wicket-keeper Jeroen Smits caught Abraham de Villiers for nought in the first over, and South Africa had made four runs in the first five overs, things went South Africa's way from then on. Herschelle Gibbs hit Daan van Bunge for six sixes in the 30th over, a first in ODI cricket, Mark Boucher scored a fifty off 21 deliveries, a World Cup record and two balls off his own South African record, and added another 25 from ten balls before time was up. South Africa also became the first team to make three century partnerships in a One-day International, and hit a World Cup record of eighteen sixes.

For the Netherlands, Tim de Leede, Daan van Bunge and Luuk van Troost conceded 163 runs in their 12 overs between them, and when batting, the Dutch team's only professional Ryan ten Doeschate was their only man to pass 25, making 57 before he was run out as one of three Dutch batsmen to suffer this fate. Shaun Pollock's six overs cost four runs, the most economical spell of the World Cup thus far.

The fourth 200-run win in ten games of the Cup thus far, with Australia becoming the first team to win consecutive One-day Internationals by 200 runs or more. Glenn McGrath became the second bowler in World Cup history to take 50 wickets at the tournament.

Australia chose to bat first, losing three wickets by the 20-over mark, with Tim de Leede having both openers caught, but Michael Clarke and Brad Hodge set a World Cup record fourth-wicket partnership with 204, and Australia eventually ended on 358 for five. Hodge's last 28 balls yielded 73 runs. Netherlands' openers Bas Zuiderent and Darron Reekers made 36 at nearly a run-a-ball in the first six overs, but Nathan Bracken had Reekers caught for 25, and four more wickets followed for ten runs. After van Bunge and de Leede had put on 40 for the sixth wicket, Glenn McGrath and Brad Hogg ended the innings.

2011 World Cup

On 22 February 2011, The Netherlands posted their highest ever total against a full-member nation, scoring 292 against England, batting first at the 2011 Cricket World Cup. Ryan Ten Doeschate top scored 119 from 110 balls. However, the Netherlands were unable to defend their strong total and failed to pull off a huge shock, England winning by 6 wickets with 2 overs to spare. They eventually failed to win any of their group matches and were last in their Group.

Netherlands captain Peter Borren won the toss and elected to bat first against England, one of the contenders for the trophy. Netherlands started well, with openers Alex Kervezee and Wesley Barresi going at a quick pace but England fought back, getting both openers soon after; and after 33 overs, Netherlands were 149/4. Then Ryan ten Doeschate accelerated, and went on to score a brilliant century, and this, coupled with very poor fielding from England, helped Netherlands plunder 104 runs off the last ten overs and lead them to a strong 292/6.

The English started off very strongly in their reply, getting their first 100 runs at a run a ball without losing a wicket. Kevin Pietersen fell soon after, but Netherlands were unable to build on it. England captain Andrew Strauss closed in on a century but holed out and all the England top order batsmen scored runs, with Paul Collingwood and Ravi Bopara taking England home with 1.2 overs to spare.

The Netherlands score of 292 was the second highest score from an Associate nation playing against a Test nation.

Netherlands World Cup statistics

Highest innings totals

Lowest completed innings

Highest individual innings

Best bowling figures

Most matches

Most runs

See also
Netherlands national cricket team
Cricket in the Netherlands

References

Cricket in the Netherlands
Netherlands in international cricket
History of the Cricket World Cup